The Yongle Emperor (2 May 1360 – 12 August 1424), personal name Zhu Di, was the third Emperor of the Ming dynasty, reigning from 1402 to 1424.

Zhu Di was the fourth son of the Hongwu Emperor, the founder of the Ming dynasty. He was originally enfeoffed as the Prince of Yan in May 1370, with the capital of his princedom at Beiping (modern Beijing). Zhu Di was a capable commander against the Mongols. He initially accepted his father's appointment of his eldest brother Zhu Biao and then Zhu Biao's son Zhu Yunwen as crown prince, but when Zhu Yunwen ascended the throne as the Jianwen Emperor and began executing and demoting his powerful uncles, Zhu Di found pretext for rising in rebellion against his nephew. Assisted in large part by eunuchs mistreated by the Hongwu and Jianwen Emperors, who both favored the Confucian scholar-bureaucrats, Zhu Di survived the initial attacks on his princedom and drove south to launch the Jingnan campaign against the Jianwen Emperor in Nanjing. In 1402, he successfully overthrew his nephew and occupied the imperial capital, Nanjing, after which he was proclaimed emperor and adopted the era name "Yongle", which means "perpetual happiness".

Eager to establish his own legitimacy, Zhu Di voided the Jianwen Emperor's reign and established a wide-ranging effort to destroy or falsify records concerning his childhood and rebellion. This included a massive purge of the Confucian scholars in Nanjing and grants of extraordinary extralegal authority to the eunuch secret police. One favorite was Zheng He, who employed his authority to launch major voyages of exploration into the South Pacific and Indian Oceans. The difficulties in Nanjing also led the Yongle Emperor to re-establish Beiping (present-day Beijing) as the new imperial capital. He repaired and reopened the Grand Canal and, between 1406 and 1420, directed the construction of the Forbidden City. He was also responsible for the Porcelain Tower of Nanjing, considered one of the wonders of the world before its destruction by the Taiping rebels in 1856. As part of his continuing attempt to control the Confucian scholar-bureaucrats, the Yongle Emperor also greatly expanded the imperial examination system in place of his father's use of personal recommendation and appointment. These scholars completed the monumental Yongle Encyclopedia during his reign.

The Yongle Emperor died while personally leading a military campaign against the Mongols. He was buried in the Changling Mausoleum, the central and largest mausoleum of the Ming tombs located north of Beijing.

Youth
The Yongle Emperor was born Zhu Di on 2 May 1360, the fourth son of the new leader of the Red Turbans, Zhu Yuanzhang, who led these rebels to success and became the Hongwu Emperor, the first emperor of the Ming dynasty. According to surviving Ming historical records, Zhu Di's mother was the Hongwu Emperor's primary consort, Empress Ma, the view Zhu Di himself maintained. Some contemporaries maintained, however, that Zhu Di's mother was one of his father's concubines, who might be of Korean origin, and that the official records were changed during his reign to list him as a son of the Empress Ma in order to sanction his succession on the "death" of the Jianwen Emperor.

Zhu Di grew up as a prince in a loving, caring environment. His father supplied nothing but the best education and, trusting them alone, reestablished the old feudal principalities for his many sons. Zhu Di was created Prince of Yan, a location important for being both the former capital of the Yuan dynasty and the frontline of battle against Northern Yuan, a successor state to the Yuan dynasty. When Zhu Di moved to Beiping, the former Khanbaliq of Yuan, he found a city that had been devastated by famine and disease, but he worked with his father's general Xu Da  who was also his own father-in-law  to continue the pacification of the region. The official Ming histories portray a Zhu Di who impressed his father with his energy, daring, and leadership amid numerous successes; nonetheless, the Ming dynasty suffered numerous reverses during his tenure and the great victory at Buir Lake was won not by Zhu Di but by his brother's partisan Lan Yu. Similarly, when the Hongwu Emperor sent large forces to the north, they were not placed under Zhu Di's command.

Rise to power

The Hongwu Emperor was long-lived and outlived his first heir, Zhu Biao, Crown Prince Yiwen. He worried about his succession and issued a series of dynastic instructions for his family, the Huang Ming Zu Xun. These instructions made it clear that the rule would pass only to children from the emperor's primary consort, excluding the Prince of Yan in favour of Zhu Yunwen, Zhu Biao's son. When the Hongwu Emperor died on 24 June 1398, Zhu Yunwen succeeded his grandfather as the Jianwen Emperor. In direct violation of the dynastic instructions, the Prince of Yan attempted to mourn his father in Nanjing, bringing a large armed guard with him. The imperial army was able to block him at Huai'an and, given that three of his sons were serving as hostages in the capital, the prince withdrew in disgrace.

The Jianwen Emperor's harsh campaign against his weaker uncles (dubbed , lit. "Weakening the Marcher Lords") made accommodation much more difficult, however: Zhu Di's full brother, Zhu Su, Prince of Zhou, was arrested and exiled to Yunnan; Zhu Gui, Prince of Dai was reduced to a commoner; Zhu Bai, Prince of Xiang committed suicide under duress; Zhu Fu, Prince of Qi and Zhu Pian, Prince of Min were demoted all within the later half of 1398 and the first half of 1399. Faced with certain hostility, Zhu Di pretended to fall ill and then "went mad" for a number of months before achieving his aim of freeing his sons from captivity to visit him in the north in June 1399. On 5 August, Zhu Di declared that the Jianwen Emperor had fallen victim to "evil counselors" and that the Hongwu Emperor's dynastic instructions obliged him to rise in arms to remove them, a conflict known as the Jingnan campaign.

In the first year, Zhu Di survived the initial assaults by superior forces under Geng Bingwen and Li Jinglong thanks to superior tactics and capable Mongol auxiliaries. He also issued numerous justifications for his rebellion, including questionable claims to have been the son of Empress Ma and bold-faced lies that his father had attempted to name him as the rightful heir, only to be thwarted by bureaucrats scheming to empower Zhu Biao's son. Whether because of this propaganda or for personal motives, Zhu Di began to receive a steady stream of turncoat eunuchs and generals who provided him with invaluable intelligence allowing a hit-and-run campaign against the imperial supply depots along the Grand Canal. By 1402, he knew enough to be able to avoid the main hosts of the imperial army while sacking Xuzhou, Suzhou, and Yangzhou. The betrayal of Chen Xuan gave him the imperial army's Yangtze River fleet; the betrayal of Li Jinglong and the prince's half-brother Zhu Hui, Prince of Gu opened the gates of Nanjing on 13 July. Amid the disorder, the imperial palace quickly caught fire: Zhu Di enabled his own succession by claiming three bodies  charred beyond recognition  as the Jianwen Emperor, his consort, and their son but rumours circulated for decades that the Jianwen Emperor had escaped in disguise as a Buddhist monk.

Having captured the capital, Zhu Di now left aside his former arguments about rescuing his nephew from evil counsel and voided the Jianwen Emperor's entire reign, taking 1402 as the 35th year of the Hongwu era. His own brother Zhu Biao, whom the Jianwen Emperor had posthumously elevated to emperor, was now posthumously demoted; Zhu Biao's surviving two sons were demoted to commoners and placed under house arrest; and the Jianwen Emperor's surviving younger son was imprisoned and hidden for the next 55 years. After a brief show of humility where he repeatedly refused offers to take the throne, Zhu Di accepted and proclaimed that the next year would be the first year of the Yongle era. On 17 July 1402, after a brief visit to his father's tomb, Zhu Di was crowned emperor of the Ming dynasty at the age of 42. He would spend most of his early years suppressing rumours and outlaws.

Becoming the emperor
With many scholar-bureaucrats in Nanjing refusing to recognise the legitimacy of his claim to the throne, the Yongle Emperor began a thorough purge of them and their families, including women and children. Other supporters of the Jianwen Emperor's regime were extirpated throughout the country, while a reign of terror was seen due to eunuchs settling scores with the two prior administrations.

Chinese law had long allowed for the execution of families along with principals: The Classic of History records insubordinate officers being threatened with it as far back as the Shang dynasty. The Hongwu Emperor had fully restored the practice, punishing rebels and traitors with death by a thousand cuts as well as the death of their grandparents, parents, uncles and aunts, siblings by birth or by bond, children, nephews and nieces, grandchildren, and all cohabitants of whatever family, although children were sometimes spared and women were sometimes permitted to choose slavery instead. Four of the purged scholars became known as the Four Martyrs, the most famous of whom was Fang Xiaoru, the former tutor to the Jianwen Emperor: threatened with execution of all nine degrees of his kinship, he fatuously replied "Never mind nine! Go with ten!" and  alone in Chinese history  he was sentenced to execution of 10 degrees of kinship: along with his entire family, every former student or peer of Fang Xiaoru that the Yongle Emperor's agents could find was also killed. It was said that as he died, cut in half at the waist, Fang used his own blood to write the character  ("usurper") on the floor and that 872 other people were executed in the ordeal.

The Yongle Emperor followed traditional rituals closely and held many popular beliefs. He did not overindulge in the luxuries of palace life, but still used Buddhism and Buddhist festivals to help calm civil unrest. He stopped the warring between the various Chinese tribes and reorganised the provinces to best provide peace within the Ming Empire. The Yongle Emperor was said to be an "ardent Buddhist" by Ernst Faber.

Due to the stress and overwhelming amount of thinking involved in running a post-rebellion empire, the Yongle Emperor searched for scholars to serve in his government. He had many of the best scholars chosen as candidates and took great care in choosing them, even creating terms by which he hired people. He was also concerned about the degeneration of Buddhism in China.

Reign

Relations with Tibet
In 1403, the Yongle Emperor sent messages, gifts, and envoys to Tibet inviting Deshin Shekpa, the fifth Gyalwa Karmapa of the Kagyu school of Tibetan Buddhism, to visit the imperial capital – apparently after having a vision of the Bodhisattva Avalokitesvara. After a long journey, Deshin Shekpa arrived in Nanjing on 10 April 1407 riding on an elephant towards the imperial palace, where tens of thousands of monks greeted him.

Deshin Shekpa convinced the Yongle Emperor that there were different religions for different people, which does not mean that one is better than the others. The Karmapa was very well received during his visit and a number of miraculous occurrences were reported. He also performed ceremonies for the imperial family. The emperor presented him with 700 measures of silver objects and bestowed the title of 'Precious Religious King, Great Loving One of the West, Mighty Buddha of Peace'. A khatvanga in the British Museum was one of the objects given to the Karmapa by the Yongle Emperor.

Aside from the religious matter, the Yongle Emperor wished to establish an alliance with the Karmapa similar to the one the 13th- and 14th-century Yuan khans had established with the Sakyapa. He apparently offered to send armies to unify Tibet under the Karmapa but Deshin Shekpa demurred, as parts of Tibet were still firmly controlled by partisans of the former Yuan dynasty.

Deshin Shekpa left Nanjing on 17 May 1408. In 1410, he returned to Tsurphu where he had his monastery rebuilt following severe damage from an earthquake.

Selecting an heir
When it was time for him to choose an heir, the Yongle Emperor wanted to choose his second son, Zhu Gaoxu, Prince of Han. Zhu Gaoxu had an athletic-warrior personality which contrasted sharply with his elder brother's intellectual and humanitarian nature. Despite much counsel from his advisers, the Yongle Emperor chose his older son, Zhu Gaozhi (the future Hongxi Emperor), as his heir apparent mainly due to advice from Xie Jin. As a result, Zhu Gaoxu became infuriated and refused to give up jockeying for his father's favour and refusing to move to Yunnan Province, where his princedom was located. He even went so far as to undermine Xie Jin's counsel and eventually killed him.

National economy and construction projects
After the Yongle Emperor's overthrow of the Jianwen Emperor, China's countryside was devastated. The fragile new economy had to deal with low production and depopulation. The Yongle Emperor laid out a long and extensive plan to strengthen and stabilise the new economy, but first he had to silence dissension. He created an elaborate system of censors to remove corrupt officials from office that spread such rumors. The emperor dispatched some of his most trusted officers to reveal or destroy secret societies, bandits, and loyalists to his other relatives. To strengthen the economy, he fought population decline, using the most he could from the existing labour force, and maximising textile and agricultural production.

The Yongle Emperor also worked to reclaim production rich regions such as the Lower Yangtze Delta and called for a massive reconstruction of the Grand Canal. During his reign, the Grand Canal was almost completely rebuilt and was eventually moving imported goods from all over the world. The Yongle Emperor's short-term goal was to revitalise northern urban centres, especially his new capital at Beijing. Before the Grand Canal was rebuilt, grain was transferred to Beijing in two ways; one route was simply via the East China Sea, from the port of Liujiagang (near Suzhou); the other was a far more laborious process of transferring the grain from large to small shallow barges (after passing the Huai River and having to cross southwestern Shandong), then transferred back to large river barges on the Yellow River before finally reaching Beijing. With the necessary tribute grain shipments of four million shi (one shi equal to 107 liters) to the north each year, both processes became incredibly inefficient. It was a magistrate of Jining, Shandong who sent a memorandum to the Yongle Emperor protesting the current method of grain shipment, a request that the emperor ultimately granted.

The Yongle Emperor ambitiously planned to move his capital to Beijing. According to a popular legend, the capital was moved when the emperor's advisers brought the emperor to the hills surrounding Nanjing and pointed out the emperor's palace showing the vulnerability of the palace to artillery attack.

The emperor planned to build a massive network of structures in Beijing in which government offices, officials, and the imperial family resided. After a painfully long construction time (1407–1420), the Forbidden City was finally completed and became the imperial capital for the next 500 years.

The Yongle Emperor finalised the architectural ensemble of his father's Xiaoling Mausoleum in Nanjing by erecting a monumental "Square Pavilion" (Sifangcheng) with an eight-metre-tall tortoise-borne stele, extolling the merits and virtues of the Hongwu Emperor. In fact, the Yongle Emperor's original idea for the memorial was to erect an unprecedented stele 73 metres tall. However, due to the impossibility of moving or erecting the giant parts of that monuments, they have been left unfinished in Yangshan Quarry, where they remain to this day.

Even though the Hongwu Emperor may have meant for his descendants to be buried near his own Xiaoling Mausoleum (this was how the Hongwu Emperor's heir apparent, Zhu Biao was buried), the Yongle Emperor's relocation of the capital to Beijing necessitated the creation of a new imperial burial ground. On the advice of fengshui experts, the Yongle Emperor chose a site north of Beijing, where he and his successors were to be buried. Over the next two centuries, thirteen emperors in total were laid to rest in the Ming tombs.

Religion and philosophy
The Yongle Emperor was a Chinese traditionalist. He promoted Confucianism, retained traditional ritual ceremonies, and respected the classical culture, overhauled numerous Taoist temples and monasteries in Mount Wudang dedicated to Zhenwu Dadi. During his reign, many Buddhist and Taoist temples were built. The Yongle Emperor sought to eradicate old Yuan influence from China; the use of popular Mongol names, habits, language, and clothing were forbidden.
 

The Yongle Emperor sponsored a mosque each in Nanjing and Xi'an; both survive. Repairs to mosques were encouraged and conversion to other uses was forbidden.

He commissioned Grand Secretary Xie Jin to write the Yongle Encyclopedia, a compilation of Chinese civilization. It was completed in 1408 and was the world's largest general encyclopedia until being surpassed by Wikipedia in late 2007.

Military campaigns

Wars against the Mongols

Mongol invaders were still causing many problems for the Ming Empire. The Yongle Emperor prepared to eliminate this threat. He mounted five military expeditions into the Mongol steppes and crushed the remnants of the Yuan dynasty that had fled north after being defeated by the Hongwu Emperor. He repaired the northern defences and forged buffer alliances to keep the Mongols at bay in order to build an army. His strategy was to force the Mongols into economic dependence on the Chinese and to launch periodic initiatives into Mongolia to cripple their offensive power. He attempted to compel Mongolia to become a Chinese tributary, with all the tribes submitting and proclaiming themselves vassals of the Ming Empire, and wanted to contain and isolate the Mongols. Through fighting, the Yongle Emperor learned to appreciate the importance of cavalry in battle and eventually began spending much of his resources to keep horses in good supply. The emperor spent his entire life fighting the Mongols. Failures and successes came and went, but after the emperor's second personal campaign against the Mongols, the Ming Empire was at peace for over seven years.

Conquest of Vietnam

Vietnam was a significant source of difficulties during the Yongle Emperor's reign. In 1406, the emperor responded to several formal petitions from members of the Trần dynasty, however on arrival to Vietnam, both the Trần prince and the accompanying Chinese ambassador were ambushed and killed. In response to this insult, the Yongle Emperor sent two armies led by Zhang Fu and Mu Sheng to conquer Vietnam. As the Trần royal family were all executed, Vietnam was integrated as a province of China, just as it had been up until 939. With the Hồ dynasty defeated in 1407, the Chinese began a serious and sustained effort to sinicise the population. The Yongle Emperor issued an order to Ming soldiers in Annam to all books except Buddhist and Taoist shall be burnt and destroyed. The Vietnamese were ordered to stop cutting and instead grow their hair long and switch to Han Chinese clothing in only a month by a Ming official. The Ming dynasty ordered the Vietnamese to stop teeth blackening so they could have white teeth and long hair like Chinese. Various ancient sites such as Báo Thiên Pagoda were looted and destroyed. On 2 December 1407, the Yongle Emperor gave orders to Zhang Fu that innocent Vietnamese were not to be harmed, ordering family members of rebels to be spared such as young males if they themselves were not involved in rebellion. In early 1418, Lê Lợi, who founded the Lê dynasty, started a major rebellion against Ming rule. By the time the Yongle Emperor died in 1424, the Vietnamese rebels under Lê Lợi's leadership had captured nearly the entire province. By 1427, the Xuande Emperor gave up the effort started by his grandfather and formally acknowledged Vietnam's independence on condition they accept vassal status.

Diplomatic missions and exploration of the world

As part of his desire to expand Chinese influence throughout the known world, the Yongle Emperor sponsored the massive and long term treasure voyages led by admiral Zheng He. While Chinese ships continued travelling to Japan, Ryukyu, and many locations in Southeast Asia before and after the Yongle Emperor's reign, Zheng He's expeditions were China's only major sea-going explorations of the world (although the Chinese may have been sailing to Arabia, East Africa, and Egypt since the Tang dynasty or earlier). The first expedition was launched in 1405 (18 years before Henry the Navigator began Portugal's voyages of discovery). The expeditions were under the command of Zheng He and his associates (Wang Jinghong, Hong Bao, etc.). Seven expeditions were launched between 1405 and 1433, reaching major trade centres of Asia (as far as Tenavarai (Dondra Head), Hormuz and Aden) and northeastern Africa (Malindi). Some of the ships used were apparently the largest sail-powered wooden ships in human history.

The Chinese expeditions were a remarkable technical and logistical achievement. The Yongle Emperor's successors, the Hongxi and Xuande Emperors, felt that the costly expeditions were harmful to the Ming Empire. The Hongxi Emperor ended further expeditions and the descendants of the Xuande Emperor suppressed much of the information about Zheng He's treasure voyages.

On 30 January 1406, the Yongle Emperor expressed horror when the Ryukyuans castrated some of their own children to become eunuchs to serve in the Ming imperial palace. The emperor said that the boys who were castrated were innocent and did not deserve castration, and he returned the boys to Ryukyu and instructed them not to send eunuchs again.

In 1411, a smaller fleet, built in Jilin and commanded by another eunuch Yishiha, who was a Jurchen, sailed down the Sungari and Amur Rivers. The expedition established a Nurgan Regional Military Commission in the region,  headquartered at the place the Chinese called Telin (特林; now the village of Tyr, Russia). The local Nivkh or Tungusic chiefs were granted ranks in the imperial administration. Yishiha's expeditions returned to the lower Amur several more times during the reigns of the Yongle and Xuande Emperors, the last one visiting the region in the 1430s.

After the death of Timur, who intended to invade China, relations between the Ming Empire and Shakhrukh's state in Persia and Transoxania state considerably improved, and the states exchanged large official delegations on a number of occasions. Both the Ming Empire's envoy to Samarkand and Herat, Chen Cheng, and his counterpart, Ghiyasu'd-Din Naqqah, recorded detailed accounts of their visits to each other's states.

One of the Yongle Emperor's consorts was a Jurchen princess, which resulted in many of the eunuchs serving him being of Jurchen origin, notably Yishiha.

Due to Ming rule in Manchuria, Chinese cultural and religious influence such as Chinese New Year, the "Chinese god", Chinese motifs like the dragon, spirals, scrolls, and material goods like agriculture, husbandry, heating, iron cooking pots, silk, and cotton spread among the Amur natives like the Udeghes, Ulchis, and Nanais.

After Manchuria under Yuan rule, Ainu and Nivkh of Sakhalin became tributaries to the Ming dynasty of China after Manchuria came under Ming rule as part of the Nurgan Regional Military Commission. Boluohe, Nanghar and Wuliehe were Yuan posts set up to receive tribute from the Ainu after their war with the Yuan ended in 1308. Ming Chinese outposts in Sakhalin and the Amur river area received animal skin tribute from Ainu on Sakhalin, Uilta and Nivkh in the 15th century after the Tyr based Yongning Temple was set up along with the Nurkan (Nurgan) outposts by the Yongle emperor in 1409. The Ming also held the post at Wuliehe and received marten pelt fur tribute from the assistant commander Alige in 1431 from Sakhalin after the Ming assigned titles like weizhenfu (official charged with subjugation), zhihui qianshi (assistance commander), zhihui tongzhi (vice commander) and Zhihuishi (commander) from Sakhalin indigenous headmen. The Ming received tribute from the headmen Alingge, Tuolingha, Sanchiha and Zhaluha in 1437. The position of headman among Sakhalin indigenous peoples was inherited paternally from father to son and the sons came with their fathers to Wuliehe. Ming officials gave silk uniforms with the appropriate rank to the Sakhalin Ainu, Uilta and Nivkh after they gave tribute. The Maritime Province region had the Ming "system for subjugated peoples' implementers in it for the Sakhalin indigenous peoples. Sakhalin received iron tools from mainland Asia through this trade as Tungus groups joined in from 1456-1487. Local indigenous hierarchies had Ming Chinese given political offices integrated with them. The Ming system on Sakhalin was imitated by the Qing. Nivkh women in Sakhalin married Han Chinese Ming officials when the Ming took tribute from Sakhalin and the Amur river region.

The Yongle Emperor instituted a Ming governor on Luzon during Zheng He's voyages and appointed Ko-ch'a-lao (許柴佬; Xu Chailao) to that position in 1405. China also had vassals among the leaders in the archipelago. China attained ascendancy in trade with the area in the Yongle Emperor's reign. The local rulers on Luzon were "confirmed" by the governor or "high officer" appointed by the Yongle Emperor.

States in Luzon, Sulu (under King Paduka Pahala), Sumatra, and Brunei all established diplomatic relations with the Ming Empire and exchanged envoys and sent tribute to the Yongle Emperor.

The Yongle Emperor exchanged ambassadors with Shahrukh Mirza, sending Chen Cheng to Samarkand and Herat, and Shahrukh sent Ghiyāth al-dīn Naqqāsh to Beijing.

Death

On 1 April 1424, the Yongle Emperor launched a large campaign into the Gobi Desert to chase an army of fleeing Oirats. Frustrated at his inability to catch up with his swift opponents, the Yongle Emperor fell into a deep depression and then into illness, possibly owing to a series of minor strokes. On 12 August 1424, the Yongle Emperor died.  He was entombed in Changling, a location northwest of Beijing.

Legacy

The Yongle Emperor is generally regarded to have had a lifelong pursuit of glory, power, and wealth. He respected and worked hard to preserve Chinese culture by designing monuments such as the Porcelain Tower of Nanjing, while patronizing Mongol and Tibetan cultures. He deeply admired and wished to save his father's accomplishments and spent a lot of time proving his claim to the throne. His reign was a mixed blessing for the Chinese populace. The Yongle Emperor's economic, educational, and military reforms provided unprecedented benefits for the people, but his despotic style of government set up a spy agency. Despite these negatives, the Yongle Emperor is considered an architect and keeper of Chinese culture, history, and statecraft and an influential ruler in Chinese history.

He is remembered very much for his cruelty, just like his father. He killed most of the Jianwen Emperor's palace servants, tortured many of his nephew's loyalists to death, killed or by other means badly treated their relatives. He ordered 2,800 concubines, servant girls and eunuchs who guarded them put to death as the Yongle Emperor tried to suppress a sex scandal which threatened to humiliate him. His successor, Hongxi Emperor freed most of the survivors.

Family

Consorts and Issue:
 Empress Renxiaowen, of the Xu clan (1362–1407), personal name Yihua
 Princess Yong'an (1377–1417), personal name Yuying, first daughter
 Married Yuan Rong, Marquis of Guangping in 1395, and had issue (one son, three daughters)
 Zhu Gaochi, the Hongxi Emperor (16 August 1378 – 29 May 1425), first son
 Princess Yongping (1379 – 22 April 1444), personal name Yuegui (月贵), second daughter
 Married Li Rang, Marquis of Fuyang in 1395, and had issue (one son)
 Zhu Gaoxu, Prince of Han (30 December 1380 – 6 October 1426), second son
 Zhu Gaosui, Prince Jian of Zhao (19 January 1383 – 5 October 1431), third son
 Princess Ancheng (1384 – 16 September 1443), third daughter
 Married Song Hu, Marquis of Xining in 1402, and had issue (one son)
 Princess Xianning (1385 – 27 July 1440), personal name Zhiming (智明), fourth daughter
 Married Song Ying, Marquis of Xining (d. 1449) in 1403, and had issue (one son)
 Noble Consort Zhaoxian, of the Wang clan (d. 1420)
 Noble Consort Zhaoyi, of the Zhang clan
 Consort Gongxianxian, of the Korean Andong Gwon clan (1391–1410)
 Consort Zhongjingzhaoshunxian, of the Yu clan (d. 1421)
 Consort Kangmuyigonghui, of the Wu clan
 Zhu Gaoxi (18 January 1392 – January/February 1392), fourth son
 Consort Gongshunrongmuli, of the Chen clan (d. 1424)
 Consort Duanjinggonghuishu, of the Yang clan
 Consort Gongherongshunxian, of the Wang clan
 Consort Zhaosujinghuixian, of the Wang clan
 Consort Zhaohuigongyishun, of the Wang clan
 Consort Huimuzhaojingshun, of the Qian clan
 Consort Kanghuizhuangshuli, of the Korean Cheongju Han clan (d. 12 August 1424)
 Consort Kangjingzhuanghehui, of the Korean Choi clan (1395–1424)
 Consort Anshunhui, of the Long clan
 Consort Zhaoshunde, of the Liu clan
 Consort Kangyishun, of the Li clan
 Consort Huimushun, of the Guo clan
 Consort Zhenjingshun, of the Zhang clan
 Consort Shun, of the Korean Im clan ( 1392–1421)
 Consort Hwang, of the Korean Hwang clan (d. 1421)
 Lady of Bright Deportment, of the Korean Yi clan ( 1392–1421)
 Lady of Handsome Fairness, of the Korean Yeo clan (1393–1413)
 Beauty Gongrong, of the Wang clan
 Beauty Jinghui, of the Lu clan
 Beauty Zhuanghui
 Unknown 
 Princess Changning (1387 – 5 April 1408), fifth daughter
 Married Mu Xin, Marquis of Xiping (1386–1453), the fourth son of Mu Ying, on 20 June 1403, and had issue (one son)

Ancestry

See also 

 Chinese emperors family tree (late)
 Yongle Tongbao

Notes

References

Citations

Sources 

 
 
 
 
 

Brook, Timothy. (1998). The Confusions of Pleasure: Commerce and Culture in Ming China. Berkeley: University of California Press. 
Brown, Mick. (2004). The Dance of 17 Lives: The Incredible True Story of Tibet's 17th Karmapa, p. 34. Bloomsbury Publishing, New York and London. .

Sperling, Elliot. "The 5th Karma-pa and some aspects of the relationship between Tibet and the early Ming." In: Tibetan Studies in Honour of Hugh Richardson. Edited by Michael Aris and Aung San Suu Kyi, pp. 283–284. (1979). Vikas Publishing house, New Delhi.

Further reading 

 Tsai, Shih-Shan Henry, Perpetual Happiness: The Ming Emperor Yongle, University of Washington Press, 2002. . Partial text on Google Books.
 Louise Levathes, When China Ruled the Seas: The Treasure Fleet of the Dragon Throne, 1405–1433, Oxford University Press, 1997, trade paperback, 
 《明實錄太宗實錄》 in the Veritable Records of the Ming

1360 births
1424 deaths
Ming dynasty emperors
15th-century Chinese monarchs
Ming dynasty Buddhists
Chinese Buddhist monarchs
Ming dynasty generals
Chinese encyclopedists
Generals from Jiangsu
 
Usurpers
People from Nanjing